Dinesh Chandra Chattopadhyay (27 January 1917 – 10 February 1995) was a Bengali writer and editor.

Early life
Chattopadhyay was born in 1917 at Paikara village, Jessore District in British India. His father Abani Bhushan was a Mathematician and text book author. After the Entrance Examination he entered in St. Xavier's College, Kolkata. While studying in college he was attracted with revolutionary movement under the guidance of Pulin Behari Das. In 1939 Chattopadhyay joined in Communist Party of India and started work as volunteer. Muzaffar Ahmed and Nripen Chakraborty inspired him to work in Swadhinata, a Bengali Weekly magazine of the Communist Party. He passed M.A. in English from the Calcutta University.

Literary career
Chattopadhyay wrote and published number of Bengali books of Children literature from his ancestral publishing house Bidyoday Library in Kolkata. He published Kishore Bharati Child Magazine since 1968. He first got recognition for the novel Duranta Eagal which was serially released in Kishore Bharati and Nil Ghurni. In 1962 Chattopadhyay received National award for his book Bhayankarer Jibankotha and Vidyasagar Smriti Puraskar in 1987 for his classic creation Duranta Eagal.  In 1982, he established Patra Bharati, a publishing company. He sometimes used a pen name, Dinanath Kashyap.

Works

 Duranta Eagal
 Nil Ghurni
 Manush Omanush
 Kaler Joyadanka Baje
 Bigganer Duswapna
 Dussahasi Ranju
 Bhayankarer Jibankotha
 Bhaba Samagra (Vol 1 & 2)
 Galpo Bole Bharat
 Chirakaler Golpo
 Oder Banchte Dao

References

1917 births
1995 deaths
Bengali writers
Bengali novelists
Indian children's writers
Writers from Kolkata
Indian magazine editors
20th-century Indian novelists
Novelists from West Bengal
People from Jessore District
University of Calcutta alumni